Osaka Mercantile Exchange (OME) was a futures exchange based in Osaka, Japan that merged with the Nagoya-based Central Japan Commodity Exchange in 2007.

The exchange was formed on 1 October 1997 from the merger of the Osaka Textile Exchange and the Kobe Rubber Exchange.  As of 1 January 2007 it merged into the Central Japan Commodity Exchange (C-COM).

Trading was conducted at six specified session times through the day.  Commodities traded were as follows:

 Aluminium, for delivery at various warehouses in Japan
 Nickel, for delivery to designated warehouses
 RSS3 rubber, for delivery Kobe or Osaka
 Rubber index, cash settled on an average of rubber prices at eight worldwide exchanges
 TSR20 rubber, for delivery at Singapore warehouses

See also
 List of futures exchanges

References 

Commodity exchanges in Japan
Companies based in Osaka Prefecture
1997 establishments in Japan